A supporting actor is an actor who performs a role in a play or film below that of the leading actor(s), and above that of a bit part. In recognition of important nature of this work, the theater and film industries give separate awards to the best supporting actors and actresses.

These range from minor roles to principal players and are often pivotal or vital to the story as in a best friend, love interest, sidekick (such as Robin in the Batman series), or antagonist (such as the villain). They are sometimes but not necessarily character roles. In earlier times, these could often be ethnic stereotypes. A supporting actor should usually not upstage the main actor or actress, but often do. The title of the role is usually specific to the performance; that is, a person may be a supporting actor in one film and the lead in another.

In television, the term day player is used to refer to most performers with supporting speaking roles hired daily without long-term contracts.

Supporting Actor Definition by Award Groups

The Academy Awards 
An annual award is given for the Best Performance by an actor/ actress in a supporting role. There is currently no specific criteria for the difference between nominations for supporting or lead actor/actress roles, so long as the actor's dialog has not been dubbed. Determination of supporting and lead roles are determined by the members of the Academy. Critics have pointed out that the leading/supporting roles have "no set rules, no general rational, just vibes" that may stem from racial, social, or gender identity bias.

BAFTA 
The BAFTA Award for Best Actor in a supporting role recognizes an actor who delivered an outstanding performance in film. All actors of all nationalities are eligible.

See also
List of awards for supporting actor
Academy Award for Best Supporting Actor (Oscar)
Golden Raspberry Award for Worst Supporting Actor (Razzie)
Extra (acting)
Supernumerary actor
Under-five

References

External links
FilmReference.com on "Supporting Actors"
SupportingActors.com

Acting
Television terminology